Must Date the Playboy is a 2015 mobile series produced by StarFlix, a division of Star Cinema directed by Mae Cruz-Alviar starring Kim Chiu, Xian Lim and Jessy Mendiola. It is the first mobile series in ABS-CBNmobile. It is only available for ABS-CBNmobile sim users who registered with the iWant TV promo.

Plot
Zach (Xian Lim) is a playboy who breaks up with all of his girlfriends. Chloe (Jessy Mendiola), his current girlfriend, catches him dancing with another girl. Tori (Kim Chiu) is Chloe's overprotective best friend. Chloe asks Tori to do her a favor: she wants her to date Zach.

Cast

Main cast
 Kim Chiu as Victoria "Tori / Bicay" Alcantara
 Xian Lim as Zachary "Zach" Andres
 Jessy Mendiola as Chloe Santillan

Supporting cast
 Matt Evans as Nathan Ocampo
 Irma Adlawan as Nora Alcantara
 Jim Paredes as Anoy Andres
 Dimples Romana as Andrea Andres
 John Spainhour

Special participation
 Erika Padilla as Joy

References

External links